This is a list of the 2012 Super League season results. Super League is the top-flight rugby league competition in the United Kingdom and France. The 2012 season started on 4 February and ends on 6 October with the 2012 Super League Grand Final at Old Trafford. The Magic Weekend was scheduled over the weekend of 26 and 27 May and was played at the Etihad Stadium in Manchester for the first time, having previously been played at the Millennium Stadium in Cardiff and Murrayfield Stadium in Edinburgh.

The 2012 Super League season consists of two stages. The regular season was played over 27 round-robin fixtures, in which each of the fourteen teams involved in the competition played each other once at home and once away, as well as their Magic Weekend fixtures played over the fifteenth round of the season. In Super League XVII, a win was worth two points in the table, a draw worth one point apiece, and a loss yielded no points.

The league leaders at the end of the regular season, Wigan Warriors, received the League Leaders' Shield, but the Championship will be decided through the second stage of the season—the play-offs. The top eight teams in the table contest to play in the 2012 Super League Grand Final, the winners of which will be crowned Super League XVII Champions.

Regular season

Round 1

Round 2

Round 3

Round 4

Round 5

Round 6

Round 7

Round 8

Round 9

Round 10

Round 11

Round 12

Round 13

Round 14

Round 15

Round 16

Round 17

Round 18

Round 19

Round 20

Round 21

Round 22

Round 23

Round 24

Round 25

Round 26

Round 27

Play-offs
The 2012 Super League play-offs take place during September and October 2012 and consists of the top eight teams of the regular season.

Format

Super League has used a play-off system since Super League III in 1998. When introduced, 5 teams qualified for the play-offs, which was subsequently expanded to 6 teams in 2002. The 2012 season will follow the same format that has been used since the 2009 season, which consists of an 8-team play-off.

The winning team from week one with the highest league placing will be allowed to select their opponents for week three in the Club Call.
Except for the Club-Call, the current play-off format follows the play-off system of the Australian Football League.

Week 1

Week 2

The Preliminary Semi-finals fixtures were determined by the team's league positions, with the two highest-placed teams (the two losing teams from the qualifying play-offs) taking on the two lowest-placed teams (the two winners from the Elimination play-offs). 
Warrington Wolves, as the highest-placed team faced the lowest-placed team, Hull FC, leaving Catalans Dragons at home to Leeds Rhinos

Week 3

 Wigan Warriors, as the highest ranked team in the qualifying Semi-final (a combination of league leaders and qualifying play-off winner), got to choose their semi-final opponents from the two winners of the Preliminary Semi-finals in the Club Call, which was made on 23 September 2012 at 12:30 BST on Sky Sports News, where they chose Leeds Rhinos.
 St Helens, the second highest ranked team in the Semi-finals, faced the other Preliminary Semi-final winner, Warrington Wolves.
Wigan and St Helens, as the highest ranked teams, had home advantage in their semi finals.

Week 4

Warrington became only the 6th team to play in the Super League Grand Final.
This marked the first time that a Grand Final featured the same two teams that played in that year's Challenge Cup final.

Notes
A. Match originally postponed due to frozen pitch
B. Game rescheduled to 18 June 2012 due to Leeds Rhinos' involvement in the 2012 World Club Challenge
C. Replaced by Robert Hicks during first half due to injury
D. Match switch as part of London Broncos's On The Road campaign
E. All matches played at Etihad Stadium as part of Magic Weekend
F. Galpharm Stadium renamed John Smith's Stadium as of 1 August 2012 
G. Game switched to Leigh Sports Village due to fixture clash with co-tenants Sale Sharks

See also
Super League XVII
Super League play-offs

References

External links
engage Super League website
Rugby League Project

Results